Aaron Abel Wright (June 6, 1840 – February 23, 1922) was a Canadian politician.

Biography
Born in Athens, Leeds County, Upper Canada, the son of Israel Wright and Fanny Stevens, he educated at the High School in Athens and at the Toronto Normal School. A merchant and President and Managing Director of the Renfrew Electric Company, Wrights was elected to the House of Commons of Canada for Renfrew South in the 1900 federal election. A Liberal, he was re-elected in the 1904 federal election. A Baptist, he married Jane Harvey on October 26, 1871.

References
 The Canadian Parliament; biographical sketches and photo-engravures of the senators and members of the House of Commons of Canada. Being the tenth Parliament, elected November 3, 1904

External links
 

1840 births
1922 deaths
Canadian Baptists
Liberal Party of Canada MPs
Members of the House of Commons of Canada from Ontario
People from Leeds and Grenville United Counties
19th-century Baptists